is a Japanese manga artist. He is notable as the author of the Sumire 16 sai!! series. He debuted on Weekly Shōnen Magazine in 2006 with the manga series Sumire 17 sai!!, then later moved to Magazine Special continuing the series but renaming to Sumire 16 sai!!.

Works
Sumire 17 sai!! (2006)
Sumire 16 sai!! (2006–2008)
Imasugu Click! (2008–2014)
Roboken Hachi no Ie (2012)
Densha on Ohimesama.
Jigoku Okotowari.
Detective Nekoashi
Ozanari Sumire.
Roboinu Hachi.

References

Living people
Manga artists from Fukuoka Prefecture
1978 births